Cruising With Elvis in Bigfoot's UFO is the third album by hardcore punk band Adrenalin O.D. It was released in 1988 through Buy Our Records. Although the band still retained the hardcore sound and sense of humor featured on the previous two records, the record contains songs exploring a more melodic style and is less focused on speed.

Critical reception
AllMusic wrote that "A.O.D. are to punk what the Coasters were to late-'50s R&B; if you can't laugh at this and play it for all your drunken cronies, you must be more of an old stoneface than Mt. Rushmore." Trouser Press wrote: "Well-played and almost tuneful, the post-hardcore Cruisin’ With Elvis contains [songs] that thunder along with concise energy and the group’s typical whimsy."

Track listing

Personnel
 Paul Richard - Lead Vocals, Guitar
 Bruce Wingate - Guitar
 Keith Hartel - Bass
 Dave Scott - Drums

Production
 Producer - Daniel Rey
 Engineer - Mike Weisinger
 Cover Artwork - Susan Vezza
 Cover Coordination - Janet Fredericks
 Photography - Ron Akiyama
 Mastered By – Chris Gehringer

References

1988 albums
Adrenalin O.D. albums